Statistics of Úrvalsdeild in the 1929 season.

Overview
In 1929 six teams entered with ÍBA playing for the first time and ÍBV returning. The rules of the competition stated that, if more than five teams entered, the championship should be decided in a knock-out competition. Because two teams had travelled a far distance to get to the championship (all matches were still played in Reykjavík), it was decided that the competition would be a two-loss elimination.
.

KR won the championship.

League standings

||Fram is eliminated
||Víkingur is eliminated
||ÍBA is eliminated
||ÍBV is eliminated
||Final

References

Úrvalsdeild karla (football) seasons
Iceland
Iceland
Urvalsdeild